Sam Gale (born 1 October 2004) is an English professional footballer who plays as a midfielder for  club Gillingham.

Career
Gale made his first-team debut for Gillingham on 23 November 2021, coming on as an 86th-minute substitute for Daniel Phillips in a 2–0 defeat to Cheltenham Town at Priestfield Stadium. On 16 September 2022, he joined Isthmian League South East Division club Sheppey United on loan; player-manager Jack Midson said that "he will come in and do a good job for us at holding midfielder and centre-back cover."

Career statistics

References

2004 births
Living people
English footballers
Association football midfielders
Association football defenders
Gillingham F.C. players
Sheppey United F.C. players
English Football League players
Isthmian League players